Majiang County is a county of southeast-central Guizhou province, China. It is the westernmost county-level division of the Qiandongnan Miao and Dong Autonomous Prefecture.

Languages
Languages spoken in Majiang County include Dongjia, Raojia, and Mulao. The Yao of Heba speak an unclassified Hmong-Mien language.

Demographics
Ethnic Mulao are located in the following villages. They are called "Ka" by the Raojia and "Kabie" by the Miao.
Jidong Township: Wengpao, Wengchang, An'e, Jidong
Xiasi Township: Wenggang, Dapo
Longshan Township: Fuxing
Bibo Township: Xinpai

The Raojia (also called Tianjia  or Tian Miao ) live in the townships of Heba and Longshan (in 23 natural villages, inside 6 administrative villages). The Dongjia are distributed in 250 natural villages, inside 35 administrative villages and 12 townships.

Climate

References

County-level divisions of Guizhou
Counties of Qiandongnan Prefecture